The Akaiwa Formation is an Early Cretaceous (Hauterivian-Barremian) geologic formation in central Honshu, Japan. Indeterminate ornithischian fossils are known from the formation. Fossil ornithopod tracks have been reported from the formation. As well as the turtle Kappachelys

Fossil content 
The following fossils have been reported from the formation:
 Osteichthyes indet. - 'fish scales'
Reptiles
 Turtles
 Kappachelys okurai
 Crocodylomorpha indet. - isolated teeth of small crocodiles
 ?Euornithopoda indet.
 Neochoristodera indet. - a nearly complete right premaxilla
 Ornithopoda indet. - isolated teeth of small ornithopods
 ?Theropoda indet.

Ichnofossils
 Ornithischia indet. - tracks

See also 
 List of dinosaur-bearing rock formations
 List of stratigraphic units with indeterminate dinosaur fossils
 List of stratigraphic units with ornithischian tracks
 Ornithopod tracks

References

Bibliography 

 
 
  
 
 

Geologic formations of Japan
Lower Cretaceous Series of Asia
Barremian Stage
Hauterivian Stage
Sandstone formations
Conglomerate formations
Fluvial deposits
Paludal deposits
Ichnofossiliferous formations
Paleontology in Japan